An election to Galway City Council took place on 20 June 1985 as part of that year's Irish local elections. 15 councillors were elected from three electoral divisions by PR-STV voting for a six-year term of office.

Results by party

Results by Electoral Area

North & East Ward

South Ward

West Ward

External links
Irishelectionliterature

1985 Irish local elections
1985